Neskollen is a village in Nes municipality, Norway, located a few kilometres northwest of the urban area Årnes. Its population on 1 January 2017 was 2,222.

References

Villages in Akershus
Nes, Akershus